Chortkov may refer to:
 Chortkiv, a town in Ternopil Oblast, Ukraine
 Chortkov (Hasidic dynasty), a Hasidic dynasty from Chortkiv